Kataba is a town located in the Western Province of Zambia. Its original name was Kataba Masamba. It is in the Sesheke District.

References

Populated places in Western Province, Zambia